The Battle of Suthul was an episode of the Jugurthine War. The battle was fought in 110 BC between the Roman force led by the legate Aulus Postumius Albinus and the army of Numidia, led by King Jugurtha. In 110 BC, the consul Spurius Postumius Albinus invaded Numidia, but left soon after to prepare elections in Rome. His brother Aulus Postumius Albinus got the leadership of the Roman army, but was easily tricked by Jugurtha, who trapped the Romans near the town of Suthul, which may be the same location as Calama, near modern-day Guelma in Algeria.

References 

Kingdom of Numidia
Wars involving the Roman Republic
Battles involving Numidia